Aicom was a Japanese video game developer, founded in 1988, possibly by a group that left Jaleco . Despite evidence to support this, the Sammy corporate website lists 1990 as the first year and that it was a subsidiary. It was bought by Sammy Industry in 1992.

Their games include The Mafat Conspiracy, Totally Rad and Vice: Project Doom on the Nintendo Entertainment System, Blaster Master Boy for the Game Boy and Pulstar for Neo Geo.

Aicom broke off from Sammy in 1996, and with funding from SNK, became Yumekobo, producing games mainly for SNK systems.

List of Aicom games 

This is a list of Aicom games arranged by release date, the order in regions specifies where it was released first. This list does not include Yumekobo label games.

List of Yumekobo games
This is a list of Yumekobo games arranged by release date, the order in regions specifies where it was released first. This list does not include Aicom label games.

References

External links
Aicom at Game Developer Research Institute

Defunct video game companies of Japan
Video game development companies
SNK
SNK Playmore